Mutant League Hockey is an ice hockey game that was released in 1994 for the Sega Genesis. It's a spin-off of Mutant League Football and has several of the same team names.

Gameplay
Unlike Mutant League Football which featured five species of mutant, Mutant League Hockey narrows it down to three: robots, undead skeletons and trolls, removing aliens and superhumans. The game has the same tone as its predecessor, with special plays that can cause things to happen like making the puck explode when it is picked up by an opposing player, bribing the referee to call fake penalties against the other team, and land mines and holes on the ice.

The teams in the game are ranked by a rating of zero through six skulls.

As with Mutant League Football, hazards litter the ice and death is commonplace. Players may substitute their goalie for a demon goalie, a gigantic demon head that takes the place of the net; scoring on a demon goal causes it to explode. In addition, the crowd is prone to throwing weapons or other powerups onto the ice; they may be picked up and used freely. When a player dies, their corpse remains on the ice and may be tripped on; between periods, a giant slug acting as an ice resurfacer eats the debris littering the ice. As in real hockey, fights may break out. Fights in Mutant League Hockey are done as a minigame, where the objective is to knock out the opponent. Both players are still sent to the penalty box, but the player who got knocked out also takes an additional penalty for losing.

References

External links
Unreleased Amiga port

1994 video games
Electronic Arts games
Fantasy sports video games
Fictional mutants
Ice hockey video games
Multiplayer and single-player video games
Mutant League series
Sega Genesis games
Sega Genesis-only games
Video games about death games
Video games scored by Russell Lieblich
Video games developed in the United States